Bakkoush is a surname. Notable people with the surname include:

Saleem Bakkoush, Tunisian singer
Abdul Hamid al-Bakkoush (1933–2007), Libyan politician